Edward Nolan may refer to:

Edward Nolan (actor) (1888–1943) 
Edward Nolan (animator) of Fleischer Studios (Betty Boop, Popeye shorts)
Edward Nolan (bishop) (1793-1837), Irish Roman Catholic bishop 
Eddie Nolan (born 1988), Irish footballer 
"The Only Nolan" (Edward Sylvester Nolan; 1857–1913), Canadian baseball player